Boduognatus (? – 57 BC) was a leader of the Belgic Nervii during the Gallic Wars. He was the overall commander of the Belgic forces at the Battle of Sabis in 57 BC, in which he surprised, and almost defeated, Julius Caesar.

References

Germanic rulers
Belgae
Germanic warriors
Pre-Roman Iron Age
Barbarian people of the Gallic Wars
57 BC deaths
Year of birth unknown